Emily Ruskovich is an American writer who won the 2019 International Dublin literary award for her novel Idaho. She grew up in the Idaho Panhandle on Hoodoo Mountain. She graduated from the Iowa Writers’ Workshop in 2011 and is an assistant professor at the University of Montana where she teaches creative writing; she was formerly on the faculty of Boise State University. She lives in the mountains west of Missoula.

Bibliography
Novel

Idaho (2017)

Short story

Owl (2014)
What Liesel Thinks of Horses (2014)

Work included in anthology

The O. Henry Prize stories, 2015 (2015)

Awards
2019 International Dublin Literary Award

References

Year of birth missing (living people)
Living people
American women novelists
21st-century American women writers
21st-century American novelists
Novelists from Idaho
Iowa Writers' Workshop alumni
Boise State University faculty
People from Idaho City, Idaho
People from Coeur d'Alene, Idaho
American women academics
University of Montana faculty